This is a list of Portuguese television related events from 2001.

Events
8 January - CNL is relaunched as SIC Notícias.
23 April - SIC Radical, SIC's youth-oriented channel launches.
20 May - Henrique Guimarães wins the second series of Big Brother.
31 December - Catarina Cabral wins series 3 of Big Brother, becoming the show's first female winner.

Debuts

Television shows

2000s
Big Brother (2000-2003)

Ending this year

Births

Deaths